Neuburg is a quarter in the district 6 of Winterthur.

It was formerly a part of Wülflingen municipality, which was incorporated into Winterthur in 1922.

The name of the quarter comes from a former castle called "Neuburg" (engl. "newcastle") on a hill above the little village. Since the 16th century the name "Neuburg" isn't in use anymore for the place where the castle was, it is called nowadays "Hoh-Wülflingen". From the former castle you only see the moats and a little part of the wall left.

Winterthur